Acroplectis haemanthes is a species of moth of the family Tortricidae. It is found in the United States in Arizona, California, Nevada, New Mexico, Texas and Utah.

The length of the forewings is 6.5–8 mm. Adults have been recorded from April to July and in October.

References

Moths described in 1927
Euliini
Moths of North America